Fancy Baggage is a 1929 American drama film directed by John G. Adolfi and released by Warner Bros. in both silent and part-talkie versions. The film stars Audrey Ferris and Myrna Loy.

Plot
Naomi Iverson learns that her father has assumed the blame for engaging in an illegal stock pool and is to be sentenced by the Federal Government to 5 years in prison. In return, Iverson will receive a check for $1 million from John Hardin, his former partner and now his bitterest enemy. She appropriates the check and goes to Hardin's yacht hoping to recover the written "confession." There she meets and falls in love with Hardin's son, Ernest. Complications set in when Iverson arrives and is set adrift by Tony, leader of a gang of rumrunners. Tony, who covets Naomi, gets involved in a fight with Ernest; Tony corners her, but she is rescued by Ernest. The revenue officers seize the rum boat and arrest the two old men as bootleggers. When Naomi and Ernest confront their fathers with their love, the fathers bow to necessity and once again become friends.

Cast
Audrey Ferris as Naomi Iverson
Myrna Loy as Myrna
George Fawcett as Iverson
Hallam Cooley as Diuckey
Wallace MacDonald as Ernest Hardin
Edmund Breese as John Hardin
Eddie Gribbon as Steve
Burr McIntosh as Austin
Virginia Sale as Miss Hickey
Chester A. Bachman

Preservation status
Fancy Baggage is now considered a lost film. Only the soundtrack disc for reel 2 survives. (It is unknown if the sound disc has a talking sequence.) The film used the Vitaphone sound-on-disc system.

See also
List of lost films

References

External links

1929 films
Warner Bros. films
Lost American films
Transitional sound drama films
American drama films
1929 drama films
American black-and-white films
Films directed by John G. Adolfi
1929 lost films
Lost drama films
1920s English-language films
1920s American films